Uranium-234 (234U or U-234) is an isotope of uranium. In natural uranium and in uranium ore, 234U occurs as an indirect decay product of uranium-238, but it makes up only 0.0055% (55 parts per million) of the raw uranium because its half-life of just 245,500 years is only about 1/18,000 as long as that of 238U. The primary path of production of 234U via nuclear decay is as follows: uranium-238 nuclei emit an alpha particle to become thorium-234. Next, with a short half-life, 234Th nuclei emit a beta particle to become protactinium-234 (234Pa), or more likely a nuclear isomer denoted 234mPa. Finally, 234Pa or 234mPa nuclei emit another beta particle to become 234U nuclei.

Uranium-234 nuclei decay by alpha emission to thorium-230, except for the tiny fraction (parts per billion) of nuclei that undergo spontaneous fission.

Extraction of rather small amounts of 234U from natural uranium would be feasible using isotope separation, similar to that used for regular uranium-enrichment. However, there is no real demand in chemistry, physics, or engineering for isolating 234U. Very small pure samples of 234U can be extracted via the chemical ion-exchange process from samples of plutonium-238 that have been aged somewhat to allow some decay to 234U via alpha emission.

Enriched uranium contains more 234U than natural uranium as a byproduct of the uranium enrichment process aimed at obtaining uranium-235, which concentrates lighter isotopes even more strongly than it does 235U. IAEA research paper TECDOC-1529 concludes the 234U content of enriched fuel is directly proportional to the degree of 235U—enrichment with 2% 235U resulting in 150 g 234U/ton HM, and the most common 4.5% 235U enrichment resulting in 400 g 234U/tonHM. The increased percentage of 234U in enriched natural uranium is acceptable in current nuclear reactors. Recycled (re-enriched) reprocessed uranium contains even higher fractions of 234U. This is advantageous because while 234U is not fissile, it tends to absorb slow neutrons in a nuclear reactor breeding 235U. This is much more efficient than the series of steps 238U + n → 239Np → 239Pu in replacing fissile isotope consumption.

Uranium-234 has a neutron-capture cross section of about 100 barns for thermal neutrons, and about 700 barns for its resonance integral—the average of neutrons having a range of intermediate energies. In a nuclear reactor non-fissile isotopes 234U and 238U both capture a neutron breeding fissile isotopes 235U and 239Pu respectively. 234U is converted to 235U more easily and therefore at a greater rate than 238U is to 239Pu (via neptunium-239) because 238U has a much smaller neutron-capture cross section of just 2.7 barns. In the reaction 234U + n → 235U reaction, the 234U content of 4.5% enriched fuel drops steadily over the irradiation period falling from 450g/ton HM to 205g/ton HM in fuel with an irradiation of 60GWd/ton HM.

Additionally, (n, 2n) reactions with fast neutrons also convert small amounts of 235U to 234U. This is countered by the rapid conversion of available 234U into 235U through thermal neutron capture. Spent fuel may contain as much as 0.010% 234U, or 100 parts per million, a higher fraction than in natural uranium's 55 parts per million.  Depleted uranium separated during the enrichment process contains much less 234U (around 0.001%), which makes the radioactivity of depleted uranium about half of that of natural uranium. Natural uranium has an "equilibrium" concentration of 234U—the point at which an equal number of decays of 238U and 234U will occur.

See also
Uranium–uranium dating

References

Actinides
Isotopes of uranium
Fertile materials